The following is a timeline of the history of the city of Arezzo in the Tuscany region of Italy.

Prior to 18th century

 4th century BCE – Etruscans build wall around Arretium.
 294 BCE – Arretium attacked by Gallic forces.
 1st century BCE –  built.
 49 BCE – Arretium occupied by forces of Caesar.
 337 CE – Roman Catholic Diocese of Arezzo established (approximate date).
 1026 CE – Guido of Arezzo writes musical treatise Micrologus (approximate date).
 1032 – Cathedral consecrated.
 1111 – Arezzo sacked by forces of Henry V, Holy Roman Emperor.
 13th century – Santa Maria della Pieve church remodelled.
 1215 – University of Arezzo founded.
 1248 –  becomes bishop.
 1262 –  founded.
 1278 – Arezzo Cathedral construction begins.
 1288 – Battle of Pieve al Toppo fought in Siena; Aretine forces win.
 1289 – Battle of Campaldino fought near town; Florentines win.
 1290 – Basilica of San Francesco, Arezzo, start of construction of church of St. Francis inside the city walls
 1304 – Future poet Petrarch born in Arezzo.
 1312 – Guido Tarlati becomes bishop.
 1320 – Town wall built.
 1375
  (church) built.
  construction begins.
 1384 – Enguerrand VII, Lord of Coucy sells Arezzo to Florentines; town becomes part of the Republic of Florence (until 1859).
 1409 – Rebellion against Florentine rule.
 1444 – Santa Maria delle Grazie church built.
 1466 – Piero della Francesca paints Storie della Vera Croce in the Basilica of San Francesco, Arezzo.
 1511 – Future artist Giorgio Vasari born in Arezzo.
 1529 – Rebellion against Florentine rule.
 1560 –  (fortification) built (approximate date).

18th–19th centuries
 1796 – Earthquake.
 1799 – Anti-French Viva Maria (movement) active.
 1808 – Arezzo becomes part of the French Arno (department).
 1810 – Accademia Petrarca di Lettere, Arti e Scienze di Arezzo founded.(en)
 1833 –  (theatre) opens.
 1860 –  (administrative region) established.
 1866 – Arezzo railway station opens.
 1880 –  (monument) erected in the Piazza del Popolo.
 1881 – Banca Mutua Popolare Aretina in business.
 1886 –  (railway) begins operating.
 1888 –  (railway) begins operating.
 1897 – Population: 45,289.

20th century

 1911
 Casa Vasari (museum) opens.
 Population: 47,504.
 1923 – Juventus Football Club Arezzo formed.
 1925 –  built.
 1930 –  (railway) begins operating.
 1934 –  theatre built.
 1937 –  (museum) opens.
 1939 –  built.
 1944 – Arezzo War Cemetery established near city.
 1961 – Stadio Comunale (stadium) opens.
 1968 –  (antique fair) begins.
 1985 – May:  held.

21st century

 2008 – Courthouse of Arezzo built.
 2013 – Population: 98,352.
 2015
 Alessandro Ghinelli becomes mayor.
 31 May: Tuscan regional election, 2015 held.

See also
 
 List of mayors of Arezzo
 List of bishops of Arezzo
 History of Tuscany

Other cities in the macroregion of Central Italy:(it)
 Timeline of Ancona, Marche region
 Timeline of Florence, Tuscany region
 Timeline of Livorno, Tuscany
 Timeline of Lucca, Tuscany
 Timeline of Perugia, Umbria region
 Timeline of Pisa, Tuscany
 Timeline of Pistoia, Tuscany
 Timeline of Prato, Tuscany
 Timeline of Rome, Lazio region
 Timeline of Siena, Tuscany

References

This article incorporates information from the Italian Wikipedia.

Bibliography

in English

in Italian
  (List of newspapers)
 
 
  
  (Section available online: Arezzo un profilo storico)
  1993–

External links

 Archivio di Stato di Arezzo (state archives)
 Items related to Arezzo, various dates (via Europeana)
 Items related to Arezzo, various dates (via Digital Public Library of America)

Arezzo
Arezzo
arezzo